The tiger pipefish (Filicampus tigris) is a species of pipefish native to the marine waters around Australia at depths of from .  This species grows to a length of  SL.  This species is the only known member of its genus.

References

External links
 Fishes of Australia : Filicampus tigris

Syngnathidae
Marine fish of Australia
Monotypic marine fish genera
Taxa named by François-Louis Laporte, comte de Castelnau